Colin Amey (born Dunnville, Ontario) is a Canadian country music artist. Amey has released three studio albums which include 1998's Colin Amey, 2000's What My Heart Don't Know and 2006's Getaway. Two of Amey's singles reached the Top 20 on the RPM Country Tracks chart in Canada, "I Wish She Was Mine" and "What My Heart Don't Know."

Discography

Albums

Singles

Music videos

See also

Music of Canada
List of Canadian musicians

References
Citations

Year of birth missing (living people)
Living people
Canadian country singers
Canadian male singers
Musicians from Ontario
People from Haldimand County